Individ is the sixth studio album by indie folk band The Dodos. It was released on Polyvinyl Records on January 27, 2015.

The album makes heavy use of the slide guitar of Meric Long, which was an element used in the band's embryonic days, but more sparingly on 2013's Carrier. It is marked from previous efforts likewise for its lack of involvement of high-profile producer Phil Ek, who worked on The Dodos' 2009 album Time to Die. Although released in early 2015, the band told Cheryl Waters of KEXP-FM during a studio performance and interview that they began recording Individ only a month after completing Carrier and before the latter had even been released. None of the songs on Individ were leftovers from the Carrier sessions and were all newly written in the studio.

Track listing
 "Precipitation" (6:10)
 "The Tide" (3:25)
 "Bubble" (3:12)
 "Competition" (3:19)
 "Darkness" (3:53)
 "Goodbyes and Endings" (4:32)
 "Retriever" (4:36)
 "Bastard" (2:23)
 "Pattern/Shadow" (7:06)

References

2015 albums
The Dodos albums
Polyvinyl Record Co. albums